Natchez  (1943–1952) was an American Thoroughbred racehorse who set two track records and equaled another. He was bred by Walter M. Jeffords, Sr. and raced by his wife, Sarah.

Racing career
At age three, under trainer Oscar White, Natchez did not run in the Kentucky Derby but did compete in the second leg of the U.S. Triple Crown series, finishing sixth in the Preakness Stakes. He then finished second in the mile and a half Belmont Stakes before going on to win the prestigious Travers Stakes.

During each of his three years of racing between 1946 and 1948, Natchez equaled or set a track record. On June 8, 1946, he won the Kent Stakes at Delaware Park Racetrack, tying the track record of 1:42 3/5 for 1 1/16 miles on dirt. On April 20, 1947 he set a new track record at Havre de Grace Racetrack of 1:42 3/5 for 1 1/16 miles on dirt in winning the Edward Burke Handicap. He broke another Havre de Grace track record on July 17, 1948 for 1 1/8 miles on dirt with a time of 1:49 2/5 in winning the Havre de Grace Handicap.

Stud record
Retired from racing, Natchez stood at stud for the 1949 and 1950 seasons but died unexpectedly from colic before the start of the 1952 breeding season. Among his limited offspring, Natchez sired the outstanding runner Bobby Brocato, a winner of a number of top races including the Santa Anita, San Juan Capistrano and Carter Handicaps, plus the Tanforan Handicap twice.

References

1943 racehorse births
1952 racehorse deaths
Thoroughbred family 4-n
Racehorses bred in Kentucky
Racehorses trained in the United States
Horse racing track record setters